The 2022 AFC Cup knockout stage was played from 9 August to 22 October 2022. A total of 12 teams competed in the knockout stage to decide the champions of the 2022 AFC Cup.

Qualified teams
The following teams advanced from the group stage:
The winners of each of the three groups and the best runners-up in the West Asia Zone (Groups A–C) and the ASEAN Zone (Groups G–I), advanced to the Zonal semi-finals.
The winners of each group in the South Asia Zone (Group D), and the East Asia Zone (Group J) advanced to the Inter-zone play-off semi-finals.
The winners of each group in the Central Asia Zone (Groups E–F) advanced to the Zonal finals.

Format

In the knockout stage, the 12 teams played a single-elimination tournament. The extra time and penalty shoot-out were used to decide the winners if necessary (Regulations Article 9.3 and 10.1).

Schedule
The schedule of each round was as follows.

Bracket
The draw for the Zonal finals and the Inter-zone play-off semi-finals was held on 14 July 2022.

The bracket of the knockout stage was determined as follows:

Zonal semi-finals

Summary

The Zonal semi-finals were played over one leg, with the home team determined by the following tables based on which group runners-up qualified. If a group winner played a group runner-up, the group winner hosted the match. If two group winners played each other, one of the group winners hosted the match.

|+West Asia Zone

|+ASEAN Zone

West Asia Zone

ASEAN Zone

Zonal finals

Summary

The Zonal finals were played over one leg, with the home team decided by draw. The winners of the West Asia Zonal final advanced to the final, while the winners of the Central Asia Zonal final and ASEAN Zonal final advanced to the Inter-zone play-off semi-finals.

|+West Asia Zone

|+Central Asia Zone

|+ASEAN Zone

West Asia Zone

Central Asia Zone

ASEAN Zone

Inter-zone play-off semi-finals

Summary

In the Inter-zone play-off semi-finals, the four zonal winners other than the West Asia Zone played in two ties, i.e., the winners of the South Asia Zone (Group D), the winners of the East Asia Zone (Group J), the winners of the Central Zonal final, and the winners of the ASEAN Zonal final, with the matchups and home team decided by draw, without any seeding.

Matches

Inter-zone play-off final

Summary

In the Inter-zone play-off final, the two winners of the Inter-zone play-off semi-finals played each other, with the home team determined by the Inter-zone play-off semi-final draw. The winners of the Inter-zone play-off final advanced to the final.

Match

Final

The final was played over one leg at the Bukit Jalil National Stadium in Kuala Lumpur, Malaysia, between the winners of the Inter-zone play-off final, Kuala Lumpur City, and the winners of the West Asia Zonal final, Al-Seeb.

References

External links
, the-AFC.com

3
August 2022 sports events in Asia
September 2022 sports events in Asia
October 2022 sports events in Asia